Systomus laticeps is a species of cyprinid fish which was described in 2016 from specimens taken in Kerala, southern India. It is found in single freshwater stream at Thiruvalla in the Pathanamthitta District where a confluence of rivers flowing through low-lying areas creates this fishes habitat. The stream is 1-2m deep in the summer monsoon and 37 cm across, it has muddy substrates and has a dense growth of emergent vegetation.

References

Fish described in 2016
Freshwater fish of India
Systomus